The Linguistics Society of Iran (LSI) was founded in 2001 in Tehran, Iran and recognized as an academic society by the Iranian Ministry of Science, Research and Technology in 2004. Its objectives and activities include promotion of linguistic and cultural researches, collaboration with science and research centers in projects related to linguistics and language studies, providing educational, research and technical services at national and international levels, organizing and hosting local, regional, and world conferences, and publication of books, journals and newsletters.

Departments
LSI has fifteen specialized departments:

Dept. of Phonetics and Phonology
Dept. of Translation Studies
Dept. of Sociolinguistics and ethnolinguistics
Dept. of Psycholinguistics and Neurolinguistics
Dept. of Computational Linguistics
Dept. of Applied Linguistics
Dept. of Morphology
Dept. of Lexicography
Dept. of Philosophy of Language and Formal Logics
Dept. of Dialectology
Dept. of Historical Studies of the Iranian Languages and Mythology
Dept. of Theoretical and Applied Semantics
Dept. of Syntax and Language Typology
Dept. of Semiotics and Literary Studies
Dept. of Terminology

References

External links
The Official Site

Non-profit organisations based in Iran
Linguistics organizations